Bundock may refer to:

Musicians 

Bündock, a Canadian band

People 

Darren Bundock, an Australian sailor
Harry Charles Bundock, an Australian brigadier
Sally Bundock, a British news presenter

Places 

 Bundock, Queensland, a town in the Shire of Richmond, Australia